Trevor Joseph Rosen (born February 18, 1975) is an American country music songwriter and musician. He is also a member of the American country music band Old Dominion, in which he plays guitar and keyboards.

Early life
Trevor Rosen grew up in Woodhaven, Michigan, a southern suburb of Detroit. He learned piano at a young age before picking up the guitar at age 16 and forming the Detroit area rock trio Unfair Superpowers.

Career
Rosen moved to Nashville in the fall of 2003 to pursue a career in songwriting. He met Matthew Ramsey soon after arriving and the two began collaborating, eventually becoming founding members of the hit supergroup, Old Dominion. Rosen signedwith SMACKtown Music and Wrensong/Reynsong Publishing in 2013. He is currently signed to a publishing deal with Twelve6 Entertainment..

The Nashville Association of Independent Publishers named Rosen and the other members of Old Dominion the 2016 Songwriter/Artist of the Year, the same year they were honored as the Music Row Best New Artist and the Academy of Country Music's Best New Duo/Group of the Year. He co-wrote 8 of the 11 songs on their debut album Meat and Candy, including the Number One hits:  Break Up With Him, Snapback and Song For Another Time. In the year following, Rosen co-wrote 9 of the 12 songs for Old Dominion's second studio album, Happy Endings, including the Number One hits, "No Such Thing as a Broken Heart" and "Written in the Sand.". In 2019, Rosen and Matt Ramsey were once again named the Songwriter/Artists of the Year. Rosen wrote 10 of the 11 songs on Old Dominion's latest self-titled album, Old Dominion (album), two of which went on to become Number One hit songs, Make It Sweet and One Man Band (Old Dominion song). These along with Michael Ray's number one hit song, The One That Got Away, which Rosen also co-wrote, earned him the CMA Triple Play Award for having 3 number ones within a 12-month period .

Rosen's songwriting accolades expand well beyond Old Dominion’s success, as he has written multiple number one songs including Dierks Bentley’s"Say You Do", The Band Perry's Better Dig Two, Blake Shelton’s Sangria and the longest charting number one song in Country Aircheck history, William Michael Morgan’s I Met A Girl. He has also written songs recorded by Jake Owen, Scotty McCreery, Keith Urban, Craig Morgan, Dustin Lynch, Randy Houser, and Randy Rogers Band as well as songs performed on the ABC show Nashville.

Songs written by Rosen

References

American country songwriters
American male songwriters
Living people
People from Wayne County, Michigan
Country musicians from Michigan
American country guitarists
American male guitarists
Songwriters from Michigan
Guitarists from Michigan
1975 births